The .38 Super, also known as .38 Super +P, .38 Super Auto, .38 Super Automatic, .38 Super Automatic +P, or 9×23mmSR, is a pistol cartridge that fires a  bullet. It was introduced in the late 1920s as a higher pressure loading of the .38 ACP, also known as .38 Auto. The .38 Super has gained distinction as the caliber of choice for many top practical shooting competitors; it remains one of the dominant calibers in IPSC competition.

Design
The cartridge was designed for use in the M1911 pistol and was capable of penetrating automobile bodies of the late 1920s. When the .357 Magnum was introduced in 1935, this advantage of the .38 Super was no longer enough to lure police departments and officers from the traditional double-action revolver.

The .38 Super retains the original dimensions of the .38 ACP case. The cartridge was originally designed to headspace on the semi-rimmed case, which worked in the Colt M1900 due to the design of the feed ramp. When the .38 Auto became the .38 Super, in the 1911A1, the feed ramp could no longer be used as rim support. As a result of this, observed accuracy of the .38 Super suffered until Irv Stone of Bar-Sto barrels re-designed the chamber to allow headspacing on the case mouth. Since then, all new production .38 Super pistols headspace on the case mouth, as with other cartridges in this class. The semi-rimmed case is known to cause feeding problems in some magazines, especially double stack magazines, and led to the development of new variants with reduced rims (typically only .003 inch per side).

In 1974, the industry added the +P headstamp to the .38 Super to further distinguish it from the lower-pressure .38 ACP. Most current ammunition manufacturers label ammunition for the Super as .38 Super +P.

Since the .38 Super is dimensionally the same as the .38 ACP, an unsafe condition can be caused by firing .38 Super cartridges in a firearm designed for the much lower pressure .38 ACP. The weakness, in the Colt M1900, Colt M1902, and others derived from that design, comes from the assembly wedge at the front of the slide. If the wedge comes out, or the slide cracks at the wedge, the slide can come off the rear of the frame when fired. The 1911 and 1911A1, having a slide that is solid on front, cannot come off the frame that way.

Cartridge dimensions
The .38 Super has 17.6 grains H2O (1.14 ml) cartridge case capacity.

The common rifling twist rate for this cartridge is 1 in 16 in (406 mm), 6 grooves, ø lands = .346 in, ø grooves = .355 in, land width =.12 mm and the primer type is small pistol. Both the Sporting Arms and Ammunition Manufacturers' Institute (SAAMI) and Commission internationale permanente pour l’épreuve des armes à feu portatives (C.I.P.) specify a bullet diameter of 0.356 inches (9.04 mm).

According to the official C.I.P. guidelines, the .38 Super case can handle up to 230 MPa (33,359 psi) piezo pressure. In C.I.P. regulated countries, every pistol cartridge combo has to be proofed at 130% of this maximum C.I.P. pressure to be certified for sale to consumers.

The SAAMI pressure limit for the .38 ACP or .38 Auto is set at 26,500 psi (182.72 MPa), piezo pressure. The SAAMI pressure limit for the .38 Super +P is set at 36,500 psi (251.66 MPa), piezo pressure.

The C.I.P. and SAAMI specified .38 Super (+P) has a semi-rimmed cartridge case.

Rimless .38 Super cartridge case variants

In recent years, cases such as the .38 Super Comp, .38 Super Lapua, .38 Super RL (Armscor), and .38 TJ (.38 Todd Jarrett) became available transforming the .38 Super into an almost truly rimless cartridge. These "rimless" cases are somewhat of a misnomer, due to the case rim not retaining the same diameter as the case wall just forward of the extractor groove. A common example is the .38 Super Comp case, which has a semi-rim extending only .003–.004 inch per side, compared to standard .38 Super which has .007–.009 inch per side. The main reason for the development of new cases was due to the semi-rimmed .38 Super case not always feeding reliably from the double-stack box-magazines used in several semi-automatic pistols popular with practical shooting sports, such as United States Practical Shooting Association (USPSA) or International Practical Shooting Confederation (IPSC). The nearly rimless cases improve feeding reliability in these pistols but are intended to be used in firearms that headspace on the case mouth. Other improvements found in some of these cases are modified extractor grooves and increased thickness in key parts of the brass for high pressure loadings.

Performance
Because of its larger case volume, which allows for more smokeless powder and results in higher muzzle velocities at similar pressure levels, the .38 Super offers higher bullet velocity potential than the 9×19mm Parabellum when handloaded and in some defense loadings. The 9×19mm Parabellum is however approved for higher pressure +P loadings by both SAAMI and C.I.P., which compensates for much of the case volume difference in factory-loaded ammunition. The .38 Super is generally regarded as a well-balanced cartridge with a flat trajectory, good accuracy and relatively high muzzle energy; most loadings have greater muzzle energy than many factory-loaded .45 ACP loadings.

Muzzle velocity
 115 Gr (7.5 g) full metal jacket: 
 124 Gr (8.0 g) full metal jacket: 

Cor-Bon/Glaser offers the .38 Super +P in several full-power self-defense–style loads with advertised velocities such as 115 gr  and 125 gr .

Usage
The .38 Super has made a comeback in IPSC and USPSA sports shooting raceguns, particularly when equipped with a compensator, because it exceeds the power factor threshold to be considered a "major" charge, while having much more manageable recoil than .45 ACP. Part of the felt recoil reduction is due to the use of lighter-weight bullets. The main cause of reduced felt recoil is a compensator, or muzzle brake. The compensator works by diverting gases at the muzzle. The greater the gas volume, or the higher the pressure, the greater the effectiveness of a compensator. As the .38 Super runs at a higher chamber pressure than the .45 ACP, a compensator will have more recoil-reduction effect.

The comeback began in the early 1980s, when Rob Leatham and Brian Enos began experimenting with, and competing with, .38 Super pistols in IPSC. At the time, single-stack 1911s in .45 ACP were dominant. Their .38 Super pistols held one or two more rounds simply due to the smaller case diameter. However, the biggest advantage was the muzzle brake, allowing for faster follow-up shots, and thus faster stages and subsequent higher scores. Competitors still using .45 ACP pistols attempted to keep pace, both by adding compensators and by reducing bullet weight, quickly reaching the limit at 152-155 grains. The .38 Super could be loaded with a bullet as light as 115 grains.

Use of compensators in competition is limited to the Open Division in IPSC and USPSA. The other divisions there do not permit their use, and the International Defensive Pistol Association (IDPA) does not permit them at all. Lacking a compensator, a .38 Super, running at major, has felt recoil much like that of a .45 ACP, and more than that of a 9mm Parabellum.

Apart from its popularity in the shooting sports, the .38 Super +P is one of the most popular pistol cartridges in Latin America due to local restrictions on civilian ownership of firearms chambered for the military cartridges, such as 9mm Parabellum and .45 ACP. 

The .38 Super round received further publicity through the single-action "Colt Combat Commander" and lightweight aluminum alloy frame "Colt Commander". When Colt switched the inventory's supply of the model from the Series-70s to the Series-80s, the model fell into lesser demand. A small number of .45 ACP submachine guns were also made in .38 Super, such as the Ingram Model 6 and Thompson submachine gun. A machine pistol variant of the M1911 chambered in .38 Super was also produced by Hyman S. Lehman.

The .38 Super also appears on the television program Nash Bridges, with the series titular character, played by Don Johnson, carrying a modified M1911 pistol in the caliber. 

The .38 Super +P cartridge ballistics have been improved over the years by the use of modern propellants. Since the early 2000s, ammunition is available with velocities exceeding . This is impressive from a semi-automatic pistol and is comparable to the .357 SIG. Ammunition is also being manufactured in the modern hollowpoint style bullet with excellent ballistics for personal defence. A standard single-stack magazine in a 1911-style semi-automatic pistol holds nine to eleven rounds, plus one in the chamber. Double-stack magazine pistols in this cartridge holds fifteen to eighteen rounds, plus one in the chamber.

The .38 Super +P is very popular in Australia (partly due to firearms laws prohibiting calibers over .38 caliber from use in IPSC) and Latin America in regards to competition shooting and is also finding its way back into the role of a concealed carry caliber.

Synonyms

.38 Colt Super Automatic
.38 Super Auto
.38 Super ACP
.38 Super +P
Super 38
9×23mmSR +P

See also
.38/.45 Clerke
.356 TSW
9 mm caliber
List of handgun cartridges
Table of handgun and rifle cartridges

References

External links
"The Super .38"

 
38 Super
38 Super
38 Super